Tipson is a surname. Notable people with the surname include:

Baird Tipson (born 1943), American academic and college administrator
Ernest Tipson (1883–1958), English Protestant missionary and linguist

See also
Murder of Jane Tipson
Tipton (surname)